Princess Ernestine Charlotte of Nassau-Schaumburg (20 May 1662Jul. – 21 February 1732), official titles: Prinzessin von Nassau, Gräfin zu Katzenelnbogen, Vianden, Diez und Holzappel, Frau zu Beilstein, Laurenburg und Schaumburg, was a princess from the House of Nassau-Schaumburg, a cadet branch of the Ottonian Line of the House of Nassau and through marriage Fürstin of Nassau-Siegen. She was regent of the Principality of Nassau-Siegen (part of the County of Nassau) for her son Frederick William Adolf in 1691-1701.

Biography

Ernestine Charlotte was born at Schaumburg Castle on 20 May 1662Jul. as the second daughter of Prince Adolf of Nassau-Schaumburg and his wife Elisabeth Charlotte Melander, Countess of Holzappel.

Ernestine Charlotte married at Schaumburg Castle on 6 February 1678Jul. to Fürst William Maurice of Nassau-Siegen (Terborg, 18/28 January 1649 – , Siegen, 23 January 1691Jul.), the eldest son of Count Henry of Nassau-Siegen and Countess Mary Magdalene of Limburg-Stirum. Ernestine Charlotte’s great-grandfather Count George ‘the Elder’ of Nassau-Dillenburg was a younger brother of William Maurice’s grandfather Count John VII ‘the Middle’ of Nassau-Siegen.

And on 20 December 1679 he succeeded his uncle and adoptive father Fürst John Maurice of Nassau-Siegen as Fürst of Nassau-Siegen. William Maurice died in 1691 and was buried in the  there on 12 March. He was succeeded by his son Frederick William Adolf who was under the guardianship and regency of his mother Ernestine Charlotte until 1701.

During her regency, in 1695, a major city fire destroyed a large part of the city of Siegen, including the Nassauischer Hof, the princely Residenz, and the nearby church. Both buildings were built in 1488 by Count John V of Nassau-Siegen as a Franciscan monastery. The Nassauischer Hof housed, among others, the collection of paintings of the Fürsten of Nassau-Siegen. Numerous valuable paintings by famous artists, including Rembrandt, Peter Paul Rubens and Anthony van Dyck, fell victim to the flames. The nearby Fürstengruft was spared in the fire. The burnt down residence building was not rebuilt. Under the old name, a new three-winged palace was built on the site, and the Fürstengruft was completely incorporated into the corps de logis. The construction of the new palace, which has been called Untere Schloss since the middle of the 18th century, took place between 1695 and 1720.

Ernestine Charlotte remarried (secretly) in 1696 (in The Hague?) to Friedrich Philipp Reichsfreiherr von Geuder genannt Rabensteiner (1650–1727), lord of Heroldsberg and Stein, since 1691 Geheimrat and Hofmeister of the Principality of Nassau-Siegen, later also imperial Geheimrat.

Ernestine Charlotte died at the Nassauischer Hof in Siegen on 21 February 1732 and was buried on 15 March in the Fürstengruft there.

Issue
From the marriage of Ernestine Charlotte and William Maurice the following children were born:
 Fürst Frederick William Adolf (Nassauischer Hof, Siegen, 20 February 1680 – Nassauischer Hof, Siegen, 13 February 1722), succeeded his father in 1691. Married:
 at Homburg Castle on 7 January 1702 to Landgravine Elisabeth Juliana Francisca of Hesse-Homburg (Homburg Castle, 6 January 1681 – Nassauischer Hof, Siegen, 12 November 1707).
 Charles Louis Henry (Nassauischer Hof, Siegen, 17 March 1682Jul. – Nassauischer Hof, Siegen, 18 October 1694Jul.), was hopman of the company of Swiss soldiers in the Dutch States Army, that had been his father’s, since 1691.

Ancestors

Notes

References

Sources
 
 
  (1911). "Willem Maurits, Wilhelm Moritz". In:  en  (redactie), Nieuw Nederlandsch Biografisch Woordenboek (in Dutch). Vol. Eerste deel. Leiden: A.W. Sijthoff. p. 1578.
 
 
 
 
 
 
 
 
 
 
  (2004). "Die Fürstengruft zu Siegen und die darin von 1669 bis 1781 erfolgten Beisetzungen". In:  u.a. (Redaktion), Siegener Beiträge. Jahrbuch für regionale Geschichte (in German). Vol. 9. Siegen: Geschichtswerkstatt Siegen – Arbeitskreis für Regionalgeschichte e.V. p. 183–202.
 
 
  (1882). Het vorstenhuis Oranje-Nassau. Van de vroegste tijden tot heden (in Dutch). Leiden: A.W. Sijthoff/Utrecht: J.L. Beijers.

External links 

 Nassau. In: Medieval Lands. A prosopography of medieval European noble and royal families, compiled by Charles Cawley.
 Nassau Part 5. In: An Online Gotha, by Paul Theroff.

|-

Nassau-Schaumburg, Ernestine Charlotte
Nassau-Schaumburg, Ernestine Charlotte
Nassau-Schaumburg, Ernestine Charlotte
Nassau-Schaumburg, Ernestine Charlotte
House of Nassau-Schaumburg
∞
Princesses of Nassau
People from Schaumburg
Nassau-Schaumburg, Ernestine Charlotte
Nassau-Schaumburg, Ernestine Charlotte
Daughters of monarchs
17th-century women rulers